Reedyville is an unincorporated community in Roane County, in the U.S. state of West Virginia.

History
A post office called Reedyville was established in 1846, and remained in operation until 1907. The community was named after nearby Reedy Creek.

References

Unincorporated communities in Roane County, West Virginia
Unincorporated communities in West Virginia